Kacem Klifa (born 1940) is a Moroccan gymnast. He competed in four events at the 1960 Summer Olympics.

References

1940 births
Living people
Moroccan male artistic gymnasts
Olympic gymnasts of Morocco
Gymnasts at the 1960 Summer Olympics
Sportspeople from Casablanca